The 1998 World Matchplay was a darts tournament held in the Empress Ballroom at the Winter Gardens, Blackpool. The tournament ran from 27 July–1 August 1998, and was won by Rod Harrington.

A classic final between Harrington and Ronnie Baxter was characterised with deadly finishing from Baxter, who led the final for most of the way, and Harrington's stubbornness in clinging on and keeping the match neck-and-neck. However, Harrington eventually trailed 14–17 and was only 1 leg from defeat. Baxter had a championship dart at double 20 in the 33rd leg but missed. At 17-17, a moment of significant darting history occurred when Harrington took out 125 via treble 15 and two consecutive double 20s. The standard check out route on 80 with two darts in hand had been, up to this point, almost invariably treble 20 and double ten. From then on, it would become more common to see players attempt the Harrington route. With Baxter (who had looked likely to regain the lead) demoralised, Harrington maintained a clear lead throughout the next leg, and sealed the title on double five.

Prize money
The prize fund was £58,000.

Seeds

Results

References

World Matchplay (darts)
World Matchplay Darts